The biblical account of the crucifixion, death, and resurrection of Jesus (ʿĪsā) recorded in the Christian New Testament is rejected by most Muslims, but like Christians they believe that Jesus ascended to heaven and he will, according to Islamic literary sources, return before the end of time. The various sects of Islam have different views regarding this topic; traditionally, mainstream Muslims believe that Jesus was not crucified but was bodily raised up to heaven by God, while Ahmadi Muslims reject this belief and instead contend that Jesus survived the crucifixion, was taken off the cross alive and continued to preach in India until his natural death.

Depending on the interpretation of the following Quranic verses (-), Islamic scholars and commentators of the Quran have abstracted different opinions and conflicting conclusions regarding the death of Jesus. Some believe that in the Biblical account, Jesus' crucifixion did not last long enough for him to die, while others opine that God gave Jesus' appearance to the one who revealed his location to those persecuting him. He was replaced as Jesus and the executioners thought the victim was Jesus, causing everyone to believe that Jesus was crucified. A third explanation could be that Jesus was nailed to a cross, but as his soul is immortal he did not "die" or was not "crucified" [to death]; it only appeared so. In opposition to the second and third foregoing proposals, yet others maintain that God does not use deceit and therefore they contend that the crucifixion just did not happen:

Jesus' death in the Quran

Jesus' death is mentioned in the future sense (on the Day of Resurrection) in the Quran, and his attempted death and his ascension into Heaven in the past sense. Below are the verses which mention the death and ascension of Jesus.

By "they did not kill him," "before his death," and "the day I die" it can be assumed, based on a cursory reading of the plain text, that Jesus did not die. By "God raised him up to himself" and "You took me to Yourself" it can be assumed, based on a cursory reading of the plain text, that Jesus ascended to Heaven rather than dying. Despite Quran 5:117 only speaking of Jesus' ascension and 19:33 only speaking of Jesus' future death, Muslim scholars like Mahmoud M. Ayoub claim the aforesaid verses "assert" Jesus' death.

Past sense

In the past sense it is said that the Jews did not kill or crucify Jesus but it only appeared to them as if they had, because Jesus had been raised up by God according to the Quranic narrative. Given the historicity of Jesus' death and the Islamic theological doctrine on the supposed inerrancy of the Quran, most mainstream Muslims and Islamic scholars deny the crucifixion and death of Jesus, deny the historical reliability of the Gospels, claim that the canonical Gospels are corruptions of the true Gospel of Jesus for their portrayal of Jesus dying, and they also claim that extra-Biblical evidence for Jesus' death is a Christian forgery. Quran 3:55 and Quran 5:117 are interpreted by most mainstream Muslims as referring to Jesus entering heaven alive at the end of his life, like Enoch. According to the Islamic scholar Muhammad Asad the crucifixion of Jesus did not take place, nor was there any substitution "for Jesus, a person closely resembling him", thus among many Asad also rejects the theory of substitution mentioned with the words "none of these legends finds the slightest support in the Qur'an or in authentic Traditions, and the stories produced in this connection by the classical commentators must be summarily rejected".

Future sense

In the future sense it is said that Jesus will not die until the day of resurrection. Given that, according to the Quran, Jesus had not died before going up to God, nor will he die before the day of resurrection, the interpretation by most Muslims is that Jesus entered heaven alive.

Possible Gnostic influences

The belief that Jesus only appeared to be crucified and did not actually die predates Islam and is found in several New Testament apocrypha and Gnostic Gospels. Although most contemporary scholars argue that the Islamic portrayal of Jesus himself is not docetic, his crucifixion narrative in the Quran could be. The Greek Father of the Church and bishop Irenaeus in his heresiological treatise Against Heresies (180 CE) described early Gnostic beliefs regarding the crucifixion and death of Jesus that bear remarkable resemblance with the Islamic views, expounding on the hypothesis of substitution:

One of the Christian Gnostic writings found in the Nag Hammadi library, the Second Treatise of the Great Seth, has a similar substitutionist interpretation of Jesus' death:

The Gnostic Apocalypse of Peter, likewise, holds the same substitutionist interpretation of Jesus' death:

The Gospel of Peter is a docetic Apocryphal Gospel. The British biblical scholar F. F. Bruce, who served as Rylands Professor of Biblical Criticism and Exegesis at the Victoria University of Manchester, wrote in a commentary about this text:

John of Damascus, a Syrian Eastern Orthodox monk, Christian theologian, and apologist that lived under the Umayyad Caliphate, reported in his heresiological treatise De Haeresibus (8th century) the Islamic denial of Jesus' crucifixion and his alleged substitution on the cross, attributing the origin of these doctrines to Muhammad:

In his scholarly monograph Gott ist Christus, der Sohn der Maria. Eine Studie zum Christusbild im Koran (1989), the German Roman Catholic theologian and professor of Religious studies  states that Muhammad's distorted understanding of Jesus and the Christian faith, along with the misrepresentation of Christian beliefs about Jesus in the Quran and the hadith, were influenced by the non-Chalcedonian (heretical) Monophysite Christianity that prevailed at the time in the pre-Islamic Arabian peninsula and further in Abyssinia, Egypt, and Syria. A similar hypothesis regarding the Gnostic Christian influence on Muhammad's beliefs about the crucifixion of Jesus has been proposed by Neal Robinson, senior lecturer of Religious studies at the College of St. Paul and St. Mary, in his scholarly monograph Christ in Islam and Christianity (1991).

This docetic interpretation regarding Jesus' crucifixion was also shared by Manichaeans. Since Manichaeism was still prevailing in Arabia during the 6th century, just alike prohibition against wine and fasting rules, Islamic views on Jesus' death might have been influenced by it. However, while Zoroastrianism existed only in the eastern and southern Arabia, the existence of Manichaeism in Mecca in the 6th-7th century is denied as lacking historical support. Similar reservations regarding the appearance of Manichaeism, Gnosticism, and Mazdakism in pre-Islamic Mecca are offered by Trompf & Mikkelsen et al. in their latest work (2018).

Islamic interpretation of events

Some Islamic scholars like Sheikh Mohammed al-Ghazali and Javed Ahmad Ghamidi argue that Jesus was rescued but was given death by God before he was ascended bodily as God never allows His messengers to be dishonored, even their dead bodies.

Thomas McElwain states that the context of the verse is clearly within the discussion of Jewish ridicule of Christians, not in context of whether or not Jesus died. He continues that the text could be interpreted as denying the death of Jesus at the hands of Jews rather than denying his death. He adds, however, "the expressions against the crucifixion are strong, so that to interpret the meaning for Romans rather than Jews to have committed the act is also suspect" and that if this meaning is correct, "it would have been more effective to state that the Romans killed Jesus, rather than to emphasise that the Jews were not in possession of the facts."

According to some translations, Jesus says in the Qur'an:

The majority of Muslims translate the verb "mutawafik" (متوفيك) "to terminate after a period of time" while others translate it "to die of natural causes". Islamic scholars like Javed Ahmad Ghamidi consider it as the physical death of Jesus, and hence question the return of Jesus. Geoffrey Parrinder discusses different interpretations of the Qur'anic chapter 19, verse 33 and writes in his conclusion that "the cumulative effect of the Qur'anic verse is strongly in favor of a real death". This verse could also refer to the Second Coming of Jesus.

Translators that favour "to die" have included Muhammad Asad, George Sale, Maulana Muhammad Ali, Maulana Wahiduddin Khan, Maulvi Sher Ali, John Medows Rodwell, Abdul Majid Daryabadi and Ghulam Ahmed Pervez, but the majority of Qur'anic translators, including Abdullah Yusuf Ali, Muhammad Habib Shakir and Marmaduke Pickthall, do not.

David Marshall Lang stated in his 1957 book The Wisdom of Balahvar that confusion in diacritical markings in Arabic documents resulted in confusing Kashmir and Kushinara (the place of Buddha's death) with the place of the death of Jesus. Lang has stated that the term Budhasaf (Buddha-to-be) became Yudasaf, Iodasaph, and then Yuzasaf, and resulted in the assertions of Jesus being buried in Srinagar. In 1981 (in Jesus i Kashmir: Historien om en legend) and then in 2011, Per Beskow also stated that confusion about the traditions regarding Gautama Buddha in the Bilawhar wa-Yudasaf legend had resulted in the confused assumption that Jesus was Yuzasaf and was buried in Kashmir.

Literal interpretation

Earliest reports

Most Islamic traditions, save for a few, categorically deny that Jesus physically died, either on a cross or another manner. The contention is found within the Islamic traditions themselves, with the earliest Hadith reports quoting the companions of Muhammad stating Jesus having died, while the majority of subsequent Hadith and Tafsir have elaborated an argument in favor of the denial through exegesis and apologetics, becoming the popular (orthodox) view.

Professor and Muslim scholar Mahmoud M. Ayoub sums up what the Quran states despite interpretative Islamic arguments:

An early interpretation of verse 3:55 (specifically "I will cause you to die and raise you to myself"), al-Tabari (d. 923 CE/310 AH) records an interpretation attributed to Ibn 'Abbas, who used the literal "I will cause you to die" (mumayyitu-ka) in place of the metaphorical "Jesus died" (mutawaffi-ka), while Wahb ibn Munabbih, an early Jewish convert, is reported to have said: "God caused Jesus, son of Mary, to die for three hours during the day, then took him up to himself". Tabari further transmits from Ibn Ishaq Bishr: "God caused Jesus to die for seven hours", while at another place reported that a person called Sergius was crucified in place of Jesus. Ibn al-Athir forwarded the report that it was Judas, the betrayer, while also mentioning the possibility it was a man named Natlianus. Al-Masudi (d. 956 CE/343 AH) reported the death of Christ under Tiberius.

 charging Islam with the denial of his death. Although it is not clear if it was known to John that the Muslims denied the crucifixion or not, rather this is his own take on it as he presented these ideas to his own followers in Greek so the Muslims could not understand it and therefore he could say as he pleased. Lawson states that the interpretation of John of Damascus is unjustifiable as the Qur'an's assertion that the Jews did not crucify Jesus being very different from saying that Jesus was not crucified, explaining that it is the varied Quranic exegetes in Tafsir, and not the Qur'an itself, that denies the crucifixion, further stating that the message in the 4:157 verse simply affirms the historicity of the event, and Christian understanding of the Muslim point of view never advanced past that of John

10th and 11th-century Ismaili Shia scholars Ja'far ibn Mansur al-Yaman, Abu Hatim Ahmad ibn Hamdan al-Razi, Abu Yaqub al-Sijistani, Mu'ayyad fi'l-Din al-Shirazi and the group Ikhwan al-Safa affirm the historicity of the crucifixion, reporting Jesus was crucified and not substituted by another man as maintained by many other popular Qur'anic commentators and Tafsir.

Jesus lives
Discussing the interpretation of those scholars who deny the crucifixion, the Encyclopaedia of Islam writes:

Substitution interpretation

Unlike the Christian view of the death of Jesus, most Muslims believe he was raised to Heaven without being put on the cross and God created a resemblance to appear exactly like Jesus who was crucified instead of Jesus, and he ascended bodily to Heaven, there to remain until his Second Coming in the End days.

The identity of the substitute has been a source of great interest. One proposal is that God used one of Jesus' enemies. Judas Iscariot, Jesus' betrayer, is often cited, and is mentioned in the Gospel of Barnabas. The second proposal is that Jesus asked for someone to volunteer to be crucified instead of him. Simon of Cyrene is the person most commonly accepted to have done it, perhaps because according to the Synoptic Gospels he was compelled by the Romans to carry Jesus' cross for him. Al-Baidawi writes that Jesus told his disciples in advance that whoever volunteered would go to heaven.

Tabari's versions of events
Tabari (d. 839–923/ 224–310 AH) divided the early reports regarding Jesus crucifixion into two groups. According to the first, one of Jesus disciples volunteers to take the form of his master and is crucified. According to the other, the Jew mistakenly carried only an empty resemblance to the cross.

Tabari narrated the first strand as follows:

The second strand is narrated as follows:

Ibn Kathir's version of events
Ibn Kathir (d. 1373 CE/760 AH) follows traditions which suggest that a crucifixion did occur, but not with Jesus. After the event, Ibn Kathir reports the people were divided into three groups following three different narratives; The Jacobites believing 'God remained with us as long as He willed and then He ascended to Heaven;' The Nestorians believing 'The son of God was with us as long as he willed until God raised him to heaven;' and the third group of Christians who believing; 'The servant and messenger of God, Jesus, remained with us as long as God willed until God raised him to Himself.'

The following narration recorded in the Qur'anic exegesis of Ibn Kathir verse is related to the substitution of Jesus:

At another place in his Quranic exegesis, Ibn Kathir narrates the story as follows:

Barnabas' version of events
The apocryphal Gospel of Barnabas (the known manuscripts dated to the late 16th or early 17th centuries), also promotes a non-death narrative. The work claims itself to be by the biblical Barnabas, who in this work is one of the twelve apostles; however, text of this Gospel is late and pseudepigraphical. Nonetheless, some scholars suggest that it may contain some remnants of an earlier, apocryphal work (perhaps Gnostic, Ebionite, or Diatessaronic), redacted to bring it more in line with Islamic doctrine. Some Muslims consider the surviving versions as transmitting a suppressed apostolic original.

According to the Gospel of Barnabas it was Judas, not Jesus, who was crucified on the cross. This work states that when Judas led the Roman soldiers to arrest Jesus in an effort to betray him, angels appeared to take Jesus out a window and up to the heavens. As Judas entered the room, his appearance was transformed to that of Jesus, and the Romans arrested him and brought him to be crucified. The narrative states this transformation of appearance not only fooled the Romans, but the Pharisees, the High Priest, the followers of Christ, and his mother Mary.

The Gospel of Barnabas then mentions that after three days since burial, Judas' body was stolen from his grave with rumors spreading of Jesus being risen from the dead. In following with Islamic lore, when Jesus was informed in the third heaven about what happened he prayed to God to be sent back to the earth, and later descended and gathered his mother, disciples, and followers and told them the truth of what happened. He then ascended back to the heavens, with the narrative continuing Islamic legend mirroring Christian doctrine of returning at the end of times as a just king.

Docetism theory
A less common opinion among  scholars hold that the crucifixion of Jesus was just an illusion. Accordingly, Jesus' body was really put on the cross, but his spirit did not die, but ascended to heaven. Thus the Jew erred because they did not recognized the "Messiah", the spiritual form of Jesus.Docetists are Christians or Gnostics who believed that Jesus' physical body was an illusion, as was his crucifixion; that is, Jesus only seemed to have a physical body and to physically die, but in reality he was incorporeal, a pure spirit, and hence could not physically die. A docetic interpretation regarding Jesus' death is provided by Ghazali, who states Mansur Al-Hallaj quoted the Quranic verse about Jesus' death being merely an illusion, referring to both himself and Jesus as something, whose bodies could be killed but not their divine element. Other Docetic interpretations might also be found in Ismaili beliefs.

Swoon theory
Some modern Muslim scholars believe that Jesus was actually crucified on the cross but didn't die, instead pretending to be dead, or that he fell unconscious ("swooned") and was later revived in the tomb in the same mortal body. Accordingly, His appearances after three days in the tomb were merely perceived to be resurrection appearances. These types of theories are also known as swoon theory. These theories were first proposed by 17th or 18th century western scholars.

Muslim preacher Ahmed Deedat of South Africa wrote several books, one particularly entitled Crucifixion or Cruci-fiction along with many video lectures widely printed and distributed all over the Muslim World. He takes a critical look at the events from the canonial four Gospels and theorizes an alternative scenario of what really happened, a scenario very similar to the swoon theory.
  
Another Muslim Scholar Zakir Naik also uses these theories in a debate with Pastor Ruknuddin Henry Pio.

Jesus lives after having died
In regard to the interpretation of the Muslims who accept the historicity of Jesus' crucifixion, Mahmoud M. Ayoub states:

Ahmadiyya view

In contrast to the mainstream Islamic views, the Ahmadiyya Muslim Community rejects the interpretation of Jesus being lifted alive to Heaven, and instead contend that Jesus survived the crucifixion, and go further to describe Jesus as a mortal man who was taken off the cross alive, and continued to preach in India until his natural death in Kashmir. Ahmadis believe that Jesus, having survived the crucifixion, later migrated to India to escape persecution in Judea and to further spread his message to the Lost Tribes of Israel.

The viewpoint of Jesus's migration to India had also been independently researched in the literature of authors prior to the foundation of the movement, for example most notably by the Russian historian Nicolas Notovitch in 1894. Ibn Babawayh (d.991 CE) in Ikhmal ad Din recounts that Jesus went to a far country. This was adapted by the Ahmadiyya Muslim Community as the basis of their theory regarding the voyage of Jesus in India.

The claim of Jesus is buried at the Roza Bal shrine in Srinagar was promoted also by writers such as Holger Kersten (1981). Sunni Muslim authorities at the shrine however consider this as heretical and say that it is a Muslim saint buried there. The claims of the theory have been examined in various documentaries, and have generated tourist visits to the site. Some scholars, such as Norbert Klatt (1988), and Indologist Günter Grönbold (1985), have critically dismissed the speculations of Jesus in India.

Adherents of the Ahmadiyya Muslim Community regard the prophecies in the Bible and hadith relating to the Second advent of Jesus were fulfilled in the likeness and personality of Mirza Ghulam Ahmad, who initiated the foundation of the Ahmadiyya movement. This view however is considered blasphemous by Sunni Muslim authorities and subsequently has led to the religious persecution against Ahmadi Muslims, especially in Pakistan.

Allegorical interpretation
In reference to the Quranic quote "We have surely killed Jesus the Christ, son of Mary, the apostle of God", Ayoub asserts this boast not as the repeating of a historical lie or the perpetuating of a false report, but an example of human arrogance and folly with an attitude of contempt towards God and His messenger(s). Ayoub furthers what modern scholars of Islam interpret regarding the historical death of Jesus, the man, as man's inability to kill off God's Word and the Spirit of God, which the Quran testifies were embodied in Jesus Christ. Ayoub continues highlighting the denial of the killing of Jesus as God denying men such power to vanquish and destroy the divine Word. The words, "they did not kill him, nor did they crucify him" speaks to the profound events of ephemeral human history, exposing mankind's heart and conscience towards God's will. The claim of humanity to have this power against God is illusory. "They did not slay him...but it seemed so to them" speaks to the imaginations of mankind, not the denial of the actual event of Jesus dying physically on the cross.

See also
Crucifixion of Jesus
Resurrection of Jesus
Swoon hypothesis
Simon of Cyrene
Unknown years of Jesus 
Basilideans

References

Bibliography

External links

Jesus in Islam
Crucifixion of Jesus
Christianity and Islam
Denial of the crucifixion of Jesus
Islam-related controversies